A fluoroelastomer is a fluorocarbon-based synthetic rubber. Fluroelastomers generally have wide chemical resistance.

Composition
Several compositions of fluoroelastomers exist including FKM (by ASTM D1418 standard, equivalent to FPM by ISO/DIN 1629 standard); perfluoro-elastomers (FFKM); and tetrafluoro ethylene/propylene rubbers (FEPM).

Performance
The performance of fluoroelastomers in aggressive chemicals depends on the nature of the base polymer and the compounding ingredients used for moulding the final products (e.g. O-rings, shaft seals). This performance can vary significantly when end-users purchase polymer containing rubber goods from different sources. Fluoroelastomers are generally compatible with hydrocarbons, but incompatible with ketones such as acetone and organic acids such as acetic acid.

References

Fluoropolymers
Elastomers

Weblinks 
 Properties of Elastomers - Chemical Resitancelist (PDF; 0,6 MB)
 Designing with Fluoroelastomers (PDF; 0,8 MB)